The 1914 Akron football team represented the University of Akron, formerly Buchtel College, in the 1914 college football season. The team was led by head coach Frank Haggerty, in his fifth season. Akron was outscored by their opponents by a total of 122–134.

Schedule

References

Akron
Akron Zips football seasons
Akron football